Country Gentlemen may refer to:

The Country Gentleman, an American agricultural magazine
Country Gentlemen (film), a 1936 American film directed by Ralph Staub
Last of the Country Gentlemen, an album by Josh T. Pearson.
The Country Gentlemen, an American bluegrass band that originated during the 1950s
Country Gentlemen members
Country Gentlemen discography 
The Country Gentlemen (LP) 
The Award Winning Country Gentlemen (album)
The Best of the Early Country Gentlemen (album)
The Country Gentlemen Featuring Ricky Skaggs on Fiddle (album)
 A guitar model built by Gretsch